In Other Words may refer to:

Books 
 In Other Words, a book by Mona Baker
 In Other Words, a book by Roberta Fernández
 In Other Words, a book by John Crowley
 In Other Words, a book by Jhumpa Lahiri
 In Other Words, a poetry collection by May Swenson

Music 
 In Other Words, a 2008 album by Ian Pooley
 In Other Words, a 2017 album by Paper Tiger
 "In Other Words", a song better known as "Fly Me to the Moon"

See also 
 In Other Words Feminist Community Center